Albert Edward De Luca (9 November 1908 – 30 June 1978) was an Australian rules footballer who played for the Carlton Football Club and Hawthorn Football Club in the Victorian Football League (VFL).

Notes

External links 

Alby De Luca's profile at Blueseum

1908 births
1978 deaths
Carlton Football Club players
Hawthorn Football Club players
Australian rules footballers from Victoria (Australia)
Prahran Football Club players
Sandringham Football Club players
Australian rules footballers from New South Wales
Sportspeople from Wollongong